Francis Joseph Comer (7 February 1886 – 11 April 1948) was an Australian rules footballer who played with South Melbourne in the Victorian Football League (VFL).

Notes

External links 

1886 births
1948 deaths
Australian rules footballers from Victoria (Australia)
Sydney Swans players
Perth Football Club players